Upperman High School is a public high school located in Baxter, Tennessee. It is part of the Putnam County, Tennessee School District. Upperman includes grades 9–12. Upperman was listed as one of the United States' best high schools by U.S. News & World Report in 2008.

History 
On August 22, 1959, Upperman High School opened with an enrollment of 363 students from grades 9 through 12 on the campus of the former Baxter Seminary. Dave C. Huddleston was the school's first principal. In 1976, a new school building was built on the same campus and enrollment was expanded to include grades 7 through 12. On January 6, 2003, the location of the school was moved roughly a mile to a new campus where the school is still located today.

Sports 

Sports programs at Upperman currently include Boys Basketball, Girls Basketball, Baseball, Softball, Football, Lacrosse, Track & Field, Volleyball, Boys and Girls Golf, Boys and Girls Bowling, Wrestling, Boys Soccer, Girls Soccer, Cross Country, Dance, And Marching Band.

Upperman has won two TSSAA State Championships in 1991 and 1993, one State Runners Up in 1982 and made the final four in 1984, 1985, 1987 for baseball. Upperman's Lady Bees 2012 softball team finished third in the programs first ever appearance in the Class AA State Tournament.

The Upperman Lady Bees Girls' Basketball team won the 2017 and 2018 TSSAA Class AAA State  Championships and also has three state runners-up (1999, 2001 and 2016). In  2007 & 2008, the Lady Bees made the Final Four of the Class AA State Tournament. Upperman Boys Basketball also has made four different State Tournament appearances.
 
The 2018 Upperman Volleyball Team made history by winning Regions, hosting and winning sub-state, and making a first-ever appearance in the State Tournament; where they finished fifth in the state.

Clubs

Upperman also has a variety of clubs, including Chemistry Club, Mu Alpha Theta, FFA, FBLA, Health Occupations Students of America, National Beta Club, Latin Club, Drama Club, Key Club, and an Environmental Club. Other groups include the Academic Team, the Student Government, and a Color Guard and Marching Band known as the Regiment of Black.

References

External links
 Upperman High School
 Putnam County Schools

Educational institutions established in 1959
Public high schools in Tennessee
Schools in Putnam County, Tennessee
1959 establishments in Tennessee